Phillip Goldstein may refer to:
 Philip Guston (Phillip Goldstein, 1913–1980), painter and printmaker
 Phillip Goldstein (investor) (born 1945), American investor